is a Japanese actor. To English-speaking audiences, he is known for playing tragic hero characters, such as General Tadamichi Kuribayashi in Letters from Iwo Jima and Lord Katsumoto Moritsugu in The Last Samurai, for which he was nominated for the Academy Award for Best Supporting Actor. Among other awards, he has won the Japan Academy Film Prize for Best Actor twice, in 2007 for Memories of Tomorrow and in 2010 for Shizumanu Taiyō. He is also known for his roles in Christopher Nolan's films Batman Begins and Inception, as well as Memoirs of a Geisha, and Pokémon Detective Pikachu.

In 2014, he starred in the reboot Godzilla as Dr. Ishiro Serizawa, a role he reprised in the sequel, Godzilla: King of the Monsters. He lent his voice to the fourth and fifth installments of the Transformers franchise respectively, Transformers: Age of Extinction and Transformers: The Last Knight, as Decepticon-turned-Autobot Drift. In 2022, he starred in the HBO Max crime drama series Tokyo Vice.

He made his Broadway debut in April 2015 in Lincoln Center Theater's revival production of The King and I in the title role. In 2015, Watanabe received his first Tony Award nomination for Best Performance by a Leading Actor in a Musical at the 69th Tony Awards for his role as The King. He is the first Japanese actor to be nominated in this category. Watanabe reprised his role at the London Palladium in June 2018.

Early life
Watanabe was born on October 21, 1959 in the mountain village of Koide in Niigata Prefecture, Japan. His mother was a school teacher and his father taught calligraphy. Due to a number of relocations for his parents' work, he spent his childhood in the villages of Irihirose and Sumon, both now part of the city of Uonuma, and in Takada, now part of the city of Jōetsu. He attended Niigata Prefectural Koide High School, where he was a member of the concert band club, playing trumpet, which he had played since childhood.

After graduation from high school, in 1978 he aimed to enter Musashino Academia Musicae, a conservatory in Tokyo. However, he had never received a formal musical education, and because his father became seriously ill when he was in junior high school and was unable to work, which meant that his family could no longer afford to pay for his music lessons. Because of these problems, Watanabe was forced to give up his intention of entering the conservatory. He said of the decision: "I had to give up my musical aspirations. I realised I had no talent as a musician. But I still wanted to find a way to be creative, so I decided to try acting".

Career

Japanese roles
After graduating from high school in 1978, Watanabe moved to Tokyo to begin his acting career, by enrolling in the drama school run by the En theatre troupe. While with the troupe, he was cast as the hero in the play Shimodani Mannencho Monogatari, directed by the acclaimed Yukio Ninagawa. The role attracted critical and popular notice.

In 1982, he made his first TV appearance in Michinaru Hanran (Unknown Rebellion), and his first appearance on TV as a samurai in Mibu no koiuta. He made his feature-film debut in 1984 with MacArthur's Children.

Watanabe is mostly known in Japan for playing samurai, as in the 1987 Dokuganryu Masamune (One eyed dragon, Masamune) the 50-episode NHK taiga drama. He played the lead character, Matsudaira Kurō, in the television jidaigeki Gokenin Zankurō, which ran for several seasons. He has gone on to garner acclaim in such historical dramas as Oda Nobunaga, Chūshingura, and the movie Bakumatsu Junjo Den.

In 1989, while filming Haruki Kadokawa's Heaven and Earth, Watanabe was diagnosed with acute myelogenous leukemia. He returned to acting while simultaneously undergoing chemotherapy treatments, but in 1991 suffered a relapse.

As his health improved his career picked back up. He co-starred with Kōji Yakusho in the 1998 Kizuna, for which he was nominated for the Japanese Academy Award for Best Supporting Actor.

In 2002, he quit the En (Engeki-Shudan En) theatre group where he had his start and joined the K Dash agency. The film Sennen no Koi (Thousand-year Love, based on The Tale of Genji) earned him another Japanese Academy Award nomination.

In 2006, he won Best Lead Actor at the Japanese Academy Awards for his role in Memories of Tomorrow (Ashita no Kioku), in which he played a patient with Alzheimer's disease.

International films

Watanabe was introduced to most Western audiences in the 2003 American film The Last Samurai, set in 19th Century Japan. His performance as Lord Katsumoto earned him an Academy Award nomination for Best Supporting Actor.

Watanabe appeared in the 2005 film Memoirs of a Geisha, playing Chairman Iwamura. That same year, he also played the decoy of Ra's al Ghul in Christopher Nolan's Batman film reboot, Batman Begins. In 2006, he starred in Clint Eastwood's Letters from Iwo Jima, playing Tadamichi Kuribayashi. He has voiced Ra's al Ghul in the Batman Begins video game. He has filmed advertisements for American Express, Yakult, Canon and NTT DoCoMo. In 2004, he was featured in People Magazines 50 Most Beautiful People edition. In 2009, he appeared in The Vampire's Assistant. In 2010, he co-starred in Inception, where he stars as Saito, a mark-turned-benefactor businessman of the film's heist team. 

In 2014, he starred in two Hollywood blockbusters Godzilla and Transformers: Age of Extinction. In 2019, he starred in two other Hollywood blockbusters Pokémon Detective Pikachu and Godzilla: King of the Monsters.

Television
Watanabe appears in Tokyo Vice, a television series based on the non-fiction book by Jake Adelstein and written for television by J.T. Rogers. The ten-part series was produced by HBO Max and is distributed by HBO Max and in Japan by Wowow.  Tokyo Vice stars Ansel Elgort as Adelstein, an American journalist who embeds himself into the Tokyo Vice police squad to expose corruption. Ken is currently starring in the NHK World Japan's comedy You're a Genius!.

In April 2019, it was announced that Warner Bros. International Television Production and Japan's TV Asahi network were teaming up to remake The Fugitive (1993). Watanabe is set to star in the upcoming remake, taking place in present-day Tokyo just before the opening of the 2020 Tokyo Olympics. The broadcast date has yet to be announced.

Personal life
In 1983, Watanabe married his first wife, Yumiko. In September 2005, following two years of arbitration, he and Yumiko were divorced. The couple had two children, a son, Dai Watanabe (born 1984), who is an actor, and his daughter Anne Watanabe (born 1986) who is an actress and fashion model. In August 2008, Dai had his first child, a son, making Ken a grandfather at the age of 48. A daughter was born to Dai in March 2010. In May 2016, Watanabe's daughter by his first marriage, Anne, gave birth to twin girls. In November 2017 she gave birth to a son, giving Watanabe five grandchildren altogether.

He met his second wife, Kaho Minami, when they were both acting in a suspense drama for TV Tokyo. They married on 3 December 2005. The marriage was announced by their agencies on 7 December, just after they had attended a New York City premiere of his film Sayuri together.

Watanabe formally adopted Minami's son from her previous marriage to director Jinsei Tsuji, and for a time the three of them lived in Los Angeles. In order to increase the amount of time the family could spend together, considering Ken's work requiring him to travel so much, they later returned to Japan. Initially Minami and Ken did not hold a wedding ceremony, but in 2010 they announced that they had held a ceremony on August 1 in Los Angeles.

On May 17, 2018, Kaho Minami's agency announced that Minami and Watanabe had divorced after he had admitted to having an extramarital affair.

Philanthropy
On March 13, 2011, he launched a YouTube page to raise awareness about the 2011 Tōhoku earthquake and tsunami and the subsequent Fukushima nuclear disaster and invited celebrities to add their videos for triple tragedy in Japan. In his video in English, he made a call to action to support the victims of triple disaster and to raise funds in the relief effort. In conjunction amidst the Fukushima crisis, he has also created his own website for the cause.

Health issues
In 1989, Watanabe was diagnosed with acute myeloid leukemia. The cancer returned in 1994, but he later recovered.

In 2006, Watanabe revealed in his autobiography Dare? - Who Am I? that prior to commencing work on The Last Samurai, it was discovered that he had contracted hepatitis C from a blood transfusion he received while undergoing treatment for his leukemia. At a press conference held on May 23, 2006, he said he was in "good" condition but was still undergoing treatment.

In 2016, while on a break from performing in a Broadway production of The King and I, Watanabe was diagnosed with stomach cancer. He subsequently announced on February 9, 2016, that he would postpone scheduled performances in order to undergo the necessary treatment. Due to the early diagnosis, surgery was successfully able to remove the cancer.

Filmography

Films

Television

Video games

Stage
 Britannicus henso (1980)
 Shitaya mannencho monogatari (1981)
 Fuyu no raion (The Lion in Winter) (1981)
 Pajaze (1981)
 Platonof (1982)
 Kafun netsu (1982)
 Pizarro (1985)
 Hamlet (1988)
 Hamlet no gakuya -anten (2000)
 Towa part1-kanojo (2000)
 Towa part2-kanojo to kare (2001)
 Dialogue with Horowitz (2013)
 The King and I (2015)
 The King and I (2016)
 The King and I (2018)
 The Royal Hunt of the Sun (2020)

Dubbing
 First Blood (1985 NTV edition) (John Rambo (Sylvester Stallone))

Awards and nominations

See also

References

External links

 
 
 Ken Watanabe at the Japanese Movie Database
 Ken Watanabe interview at USA Today
 Ken Watanabe interview at About.com

1959 births
Living people
20th-century Japanese male actors
21st-century Japanese male actors
Actors from Niigata Prefecture
Male voice actors from Niigata Prefecture
Japanese male film actors
Japanese male musical theatre actors
Japanese male stage actors
Japanese male television actors
Japanese male video game actors
Japanese male voice actors
Taiga drama lead actors